Mastic–Shirley is a station on the Long Island Rail Road's Montauk Branch in Shirley, New York. This station is reached via William Floyd Parkway. The station has two ticket machines.

History

Service for the Mastic–Shirley train station began July 7, 1960. The now-unused station house at the original station was torn down a month later. When Center Moriches station was eliminated by the LIRR on March 16, 1998, Mastic–Shirley station was one of two stations recommended for use as a substitute by the patrons of the now-closed station. The other was Speonk station.

Station layout
The station has one four-car-long high-level platform on the south side of the single track. JJD interlocking (formerly MS), a remote-controlled siding where trains can pass each other, is located east of the station.

Notable places nearby
Fire Island National Seashore
Poospatuck Reservation
Southaven County Park
Smith Point County Park
Brookhaven National Laboratory
Brookhaven Airport

References

External links

February 2000 Photo (Unofficial LIRR History Website)
Unofficial LIRR Photography Pages (lirrpics.com)
Mastic–Shirley Station
MS (JJD) Interlocking (The LIRR Today)

Long Island Rail Road stations in Suffolk County, New York
Brookhaven, New York
Railway stations in the United States opened in 1960
1960 establishments in New York (state)